Étienne Maurice Gérard, 1st Comte Gérard (4 April 177317 April 1852) was a French general, statesman and Marshal of France. He served under a succession of French governments including the ancien regime monarchy, the Revolutionary governments, the Restorations, the July Monarchy, the First and Second Republics, and the First Empire (and arguably the Second), becoming prime minister briefly in 1834.

Biography

Early life and career
Born at Damvillers, in Lorraine, he joined a battalion of volunteers in 1791, and served in the campaigns of 1792–1793 under Generals Charles François Dumouriez and Jean-Baptiste Jourdan. In 1795, he served Jean-Baptiste Bernadotte as aide-de-camp. In 1799 he was promoted chef d'escadron, and in 1800 colonel.

Rise to prominence
He distinguished himself at the battles of Austerlitz and Jena, and was made Brigadier General in November 1806, and for his conduct in the battle of Wagram he was created a baron of the First French Empire.

In the Spanish campaign of 1810 and 1811, Gérard gained special distinction at the Battle of Fuentes de Oñoro; and in the expedition to Russia he was present at the battle of Smolensk and the battle of Valutino, and displayed such bravery and ability in the battle of Borodino that he was made général de division. He won further distinction in the disastrous retreat from Moscow.

Campaigns of 1813–1814
In the campaign of 1813, in command of a division, he took part in the battle of Lützen and the battle of Bautzen, as well as in the operations of Marshal Macdonald, and at the battle of Leipzig (in which he commanded the XI Corps) he was gravely wounded. After the battle of Bautzen, he was created by Napoleon a count of the Empire.
In the Six Days' Campaign of 1814, and especially at La Rothière and the battle of Montereau, in which he took over command of 2nd corps from Marshal Victor, he won still greater distinction.

Restoration and July Revolution
After the first Bourbon Restoration, he was named by King Louis XVIII Grand Cross of the Legion of Honor and chevalier of St Louis.

During the Hundred Days, Napoleon made Gérard a Peer of France and placed him in command of the IV Corps of the Army of the North. In this capacity Gérard took a brilliant part in the battle of Ligny, and on the morning of 18 June he was foremost in advising Marshal Grouchy to march to the sound of the guns to aid the emperor at Waterloo. Having failed in this he took part in the battle of Wavre.

Gérard retired to Brussels after the fall of Napoleon, and did not return to France until 1817. He sat as a member of the Restoration's Chamber of Deputies in 1822–1824, and was re-elected in 1827.

Gérard took part in the July Revolution of 1830, after which he was appointed minister of war and named a Marshal of France. On account of his health he resigned the office of War Minister in the following October.

Belgian campaign and later distinctions
However, in 1831 he took the command of the Northern Army, and was successful in forcing the army of the Netherlands to withdraw from Belgium (see Belgian Revolution). In 1832 he commanded the besieging army in the famous scientific siege of the citadel of Antwerp.

He was again chosen war minister in July 1834, and served as Prime Minister of the July Monarchy, but resigned in the following October. In 1836 he was named grand chancellor of the Legion of Honour in succession to Marshal Mortier, and in 1838 commander of the National Guards of the Seine département, an office which he held until 1842. He became a senator of the Second Empire in 1852 (before it was formally instituted), and died in the same year, aged 79.

Marriage and descendants
Gérard married Rosemonde de Valence. Their granddaughter was Rosemonde Gérard.

Notes

References

1773 births
1852 deaths
People from Meuse (department)
Counts of the First French Empire
Politicians from Grand Est
Prime Ministers of France
French Ministers of War
Members of the Chamber of Peers of the Hundred Days
Members of the Chamber of Deputies of the Bourbon Restoration
Members of the 1st Chamber of Deputies of the July Monarchy
Members of the 2nd Chamber of Deputies of the July Monarchy
Members of the Chamber of Peers of the July Monarchy
French Senators of the Second Empire
Marshals of France
French military personnel of the French Revolutionary Wars
French commanders of the Napoleonic Wars
People of the Belgian Revolution
Grand Croix of the Légion d'honneur
Grand Chanceliers of the Légion d'honneur
Names inscribed under the Arc de Triomphe